Tursunov is a surname. Notable people with the surname include:

 Dmitry Tursunov (born 1982), Russian tennis player and coach
 Sanzhar Tursunov (born 1986), Russian and Uzbekistani football player
 Anvar-qori Tursunov, imam at the Kukeldash mosque in Tashkent
 Furkat Tursunov Turkmen football player